Abbinahole  is a village in the southern state of Karnataka, India. It is located in the Hiriyur taluk of Chitradurga district in Karnataka.

See also
 Chitradurga
 Districts of Karnataka

References

External links
 Chitradurga District website

Villages in Chitradurga district